Spabrücken is a municipality in the district of Bad Kreuznach in Rhineland-Palatinate, in western Germany. It has a population of 1,218 residents.

References
Spabrücken Map- Rhineland  https://germany.places-in-the-world.com/2830869-place-spabrucken.html

Bad Kreuznach (district)